Sally Christian Preininger (born 3 January 1996) is an Austrian footballer currently playing for SC Kalsdorf in the Austrian Regionalliga Central.

External links
 

1996 births
Living people
Austrian footballers
SV Horn players
2. Liga (Austria) players
Association football forwards